Tol-e Meshkin (also Romanized as Tol-e Meshkīn; also known as Tol-e Meshgī) is a village in Bakesh-e Yek Rural District, in the Central District of Mamasani County, Fars Province, Iran. At the 2006 census, its population was 245, in 51 families.

References 

Populated places in Mamasani County